A banknote counter or bill counter is a device designed primarily to accurately count a quantity of banknotes. Additionally, a banknote counter may sort banknotes into batches and check for damaged or counterfeit notes.

History 
The first automatic bill counting machines (or money counting machines) were introduced in the 1920s in the United States and were produced by the Federal Bill Counter Company of Washington, D.C. These machines were designed to increase efficiency in tellers in the Federal Reserve Bank and reduce human error. The machine would stop once a set “batch” of notes was reached allowing a teller to insert a wooden block to keep batches separate.

Modern counting machines use a technology developed by Tokyo Calculating Machine Works of Shinagawa, Tokyo and introduced in 1962. It quickly dominated the market for increased speed and accuracy.

In 1981 computerized friction note counters were introduced in the form of the REI High-Speed machine, which sped up note counting to 72,000 notes per hour and eliminated the need manual sorting and counting completely. This innovative Sorter machine could also sort notes according to their value and remove counterfeit or heavily damaged notes. Many of these features are present in today’s note counting machines, some of which can detect a note's security features (e.g. magnetic ink, ultraviolet ink, magnetic strip, note density etc.) to identify counterfeit and damaged notes.

Other extra features that facilitate everyday contact with cash may also be present.

Footnotes

Banknotes
Counting instruments
American inventions
20th-century inventions